Carpentier is a surname.

Carpentier may also refer to:

Carpentier joint
Carpentier River
Carpentier, Port-Salut, Haiti, a village in the Sud department of Haiti.